Enriko Kehl (born February 19, 1992), is a German Muay Thai kickboxer who competes in the Lightweight division of GLORY. He is the 2014 K-1 World Max Championship Tournament Champion. Kehl was voted German Kickboxer of the Year in 2012, 2013 and 2014.

Career

Early career
After turning professional, Kehl's first prestigious match was in on December 5, 2009, in Bangkok, against Fadi Merza in the quarterfinals of the WMC King's Cup, which he lost. Following this, he fought with another kickboxing veteran, Murat Direkçi, but lost again, on October 10, 2010, in Darmstadt, in Germany.

After some matches, he fought with a great name of the Muay Thai world: Eakpracha Meenayothin, the first great match of his career, from the MAX Muay Thai 1 at Surin, in Thailand, was the March 23, 2013. The fight ended in a draw. After the draw with Eakpracha Meenayothin, at Thailand vs Germany 2013 in Ulm, Germany, he won against Bernueng Topking Boxing.

On June 15, 2013, at MixFight XIV in Darmstadt, he won against Erkan Varol, match that earned him two titles: the MixFight and I.S.K.A. Oriental Rules Supermiddleweight titles.

After this date has been confirmed as one of the best emergent young fighters in the world.

Breakthrough
On September 14, 2013, at Mallorca, Spain, The Hurricane arrived in the K-1 World MAX, and won at the final 16 with Henri van Opstal, and advanced to the quarter final.

After he fought two prestigious matches, against the Muay Thai legend Buakaw Banchamek at MAX Muay Thai 5: The Final Chapter (December 10, 2013), and for the W5 Lightweight European Title against Dzhabar Askerov, at NewFC: Battle of the Stars December 22, 2013. He lost both matches.

At K-1 World Max quarterfinals he won in Gran Canaria with Maximo Suárez, and, advanced at the final 4 fought in Baku, Azerbaijan, also with Shane Campbell. Actually, he is one of the younger K-1 World Max finalists of the tournament's history.

Kehl was initially set to rematch Buakaw Banchamek in the K-1 World MAX 2013 World Championship Tournament Final in Pattaya, Thailand on July 26, 2014. The event was postponed due to the 2014 Thai coup d'état, however. Kehl won a rematch with Buakaw by forfeit in a bout in Pattaya on 12 October 2014.

Kehl will face the Russian Dzhabar Askerov in the Kunlun Fight -70 kg 4 man Tournament in Sochi, Russia on 15 August 2015

2018
Kehl fought Yodsanklai Fairtex on February 4, 2018, at Kunlun Fight 69 in Guiyang, China and lost by decision.

ONE Championship
On January 9, 2019, it was reported that Kehl had signed with the Singapore-based promotion ONE Championship.

On March 8, 2019, he made his promotional debut at ONE Championship: Reign of Valor, defeating Liam Nolan by second-round TKO.

Kehl was entered into the 2019 ONE Featherweight Kickboxing World Grand Prix, which featured names like Giorgio Petrosyan and Yodsanklai Fairtex. On May 17, 2019, he lost to Dzhabar Askerov in the Grand Prix Quarter-Final by unanimous decision at ONE Championship: Enter the Dragon.

On November 16, 2019, Kehl defeated Armen Petrosyan by second-round TKO at ONE Championship: Age Of Dragons.

Kehl faced promotional newcomer Chingiz Allazov at ONE on TNT 1 on April 7, 2021. He won a close bout via split decision.

Kehl faced Davit Kiria in the quarter-finals of the 2021 ONE Kickboxing Featherweight Grand Prix at ONE Championship: First Strike on October 15, 2021. He lost the fight by first-round TKO.

Kehl faced Tayfun Özcan at ONE: Full Circle on February 25, 2022. He lost the bout via unanimous decision.

GLORY Kickboxing 
On January 23, 2023, Kehl announced that he has signed a multi-year contract with GLORY.

Titles

Professional
2016 Wu Lin Feng World 70 kg Group C 4MAN-Tournament
2014 W.K.U. Thaiboxing Rules World Championship -70 kg
2014 K-1 World Max Championship Tournament Champion -70 kg
2013 MixFight Full Muay Thai Middleweight World Title -72,5 kg
2013 I.S.K.A. Oriental Rules Middleweight World Champion -75 kg
2012 M.T.B.D. Muay Thai Middleweight German Champion -75 kg

Amateur
2012 I.F.M.A. EuropaCup Muaythai Champion in Dresden, Germany -75 kg
2011 I.F.M.A. European Championships in Antalya, Turkey  -71 kg

Awards
2014 GroundAndPound National Kickboxer of the Year.
2013 GroundAndPound National Kickboxer of the Year.
2013 AllTheBestFights.Com Best Knockouts of the Year vs. Bernueng Topking Boxing on March 23
2012 GroundAndPound National Kickboxer of the Year.

Kickboxing record

|- style="background:#fbb;"
| 2022-02-25 || Loss ||align=left| Tayfun Özcan || ONE: Full Circle || Kallang, Singapore || Decision (Unanimous) || 3 || 3:00  
|- style="background:#fbb;"
| 2021-10-15|| Loss ||align=left| Davit Kiria || ONE Championship: First Strike || Kallang, Singapore || TKO (3 Knockdown Rule/Punches) || 1 || 2:50 
|-
! style=background:white colspan=9 |
|- style="background:#cfc;"
|  2021-04-07 || Win || align="left" | Chingiz Allazov || ONE on TNT || Kallang, Singapore || Decision (Split) || 3 || 3:00
|-
|- style="background:#cfc;"
|  2019-12-07 || Win || align="left" | Andrej Kedveš || Mix Fight Championship 27 || Frankfurt, Germany || Decision (Unanimous) || 3 || 3:00
|- style="background:#cfc;"
|  2019-11-16 || Win || align="left" | Armen Petrosyan || ONE Championship: Age Of Dragons || Beijing, China || TKO (Knees and Punches) || 2 || 1:55
|-
|-  bgcolor="#fbb"
|  2019-05-17 || Loss || align="left" | Dzhabar Askerov || ONE Championship: Enter the Dragon || Kallang, Singapore || Decision (Unanimous) || 3 || 3:00
|-
! style=background:white colspan=9 |
|- style="background:#cfc;"
|  2019-03-08 || Win || align="left" | Liam Nolan || ONE Championship 92: Reign of Valor || Yangon, Myanmar || TKO (Left Knee to the Body) || 2 ||
|- style="background:#cfc;"
| 2018-12-01|| Win ||align=left| Mohammed El Mir || Mix Fight Gala 25 || Germany || KO (Punches)|| 2 ||
|-
|- style="background:#cfc;" 
| 2018-10-27 || Win || align="left" | Jordan Watson || Enfusion Live  || Germany || Decision (Unanimous) || 3 || 3:00
|-
|-  style="background:#fbb;"
| 2018-02-03 || Loss || align="left| Yodsanklai Fairtex || Wu Lin Feng 2018: World Championship in Shenzhen || Shenzhen, China || Decision (unanimous) || 3 || 3:00
|-
|- style="background:#cfc;"
| 2017-12-02 || Win || align="left" | Arbi Emiev || Mix Fight Gala 23  || Frankfurt, Germany || Decision (Unanimous) || 3 || 3:00
|-
|-  style="background:#fbb;"
| 2017-09-02 || Loss || align="left| Sitthichai Sitsongpeenong || Wu Lin Feng - Yi Long challenge Tournament Semi Finals || Zhengzhou, China || Decision (unanimous) || 3 || 3:00
|-
|- style="background:#cfc;"
| 2017-06-03 || Win ||align=left| Ravy Brunow || Wu Lin Feng: China vs. Japan || Changsha, China || Decision (unanimous) || 3 || 3:00
|-
|- style="background:#fbb;"
| 2017-04-08|| Loss ||align=left| Mustapha Haida || Bellator Kickboxing 5 || Torino, Italy || Decision (split) || 3 || 3:00
|-
|- style="background:#fbb;"
| 2017-01-14|| Loss ||align=left| Shamil Gasanbekov || Wu Lin Feng 2016 World Kickboxing Championship, Final || Zhengzhou, China || Decision (unanimous) || 3 || 3:00
|-
! style=background:white colspan=9 |
|-
|- style="background:#cfc;"
| 2017-01-14|| Win ||align=left| Farkhad Akhmedjanov || Wu Lin Feng 2016 World Kickboxing Championship, Semi Finals || Zhengzhou, China || Decision (unanimous) || 3 || 3:00
|-
|-  style="background:#cfc;"
| 2016-12-03 || Win ||align=left| Song Shaoqiu|| Mix Fight Gala 20 || Frankfurt, Germany || Decision (unanimous) || 3 || 3:00
|-
|-  style="background:#cfc;"
| 2016-09-03 || Win ||align=left| Ji Xiang || Wu Lin Feng World Championship 2016 – 70 kg Tournament, Quarter Finals || Zhengzhou, China || TKO || 2 || 
|-
! style=background:white colspan=9 |
|-  style="background:#cfc;"
| 2016-09-03 || Win ||align=left| Zhao Yan || Wu Lin Feng World Championship 2016 – 70 kg Tournament Final 16 || Zhengzhou, China || Decision (unanimous) || 3 || 3:00
|-
|- style="background:#fbb;"
| 2016-06-24 || Loss ||align=left| Chingiz Allazov || Monte-Carlo Fighting Masters || Monte-Carlo, Monaco || KO || 5 || 2:59
|-
! style=background:white colspan=9 |
|-
|-  style="background:#cfc;"
| 2016-05-07 || Win ||align=left| Jiao Fukai || Glory of Heroes 2 || Shenzhen, China || TKO || 2 || 
|-
|- style="background:#fbb;"
| 2016-04-02 || Loss ||align=left| Yi Long || Glory of Heroes 1 || Shenzhen, China || Unanimous Decision || 3 || 3:00
|-
|-  style="background:#cfc;"
| 2015-12-05 || Win ||align=left| Hu Yafei || Mix Fight Gala || Frankfurt, Germany || Decision (unanimous) || 3 || 3:00
|-
|-  style="background:#cfc;"
| 2015-11-07 || Win ||align=left| Zhao Chunyang || Wu Lin Feng 2015 || Shenyang, China || Decision || 3 || 3:00
|-
|- style="background:#fbb;"
| 2015-08-15 || Loss ||align=left| Dzhabar Askerov || Kunlun Fight 29 - Middleweight Tournament, Semi Finals || Sochi, Russia || KO (right hook) || 2 || 2:19
|-  style="background:#cfc;"
| 2015-05-15 || Win||align=left| Mohamed Diaby || Kunlun Fight 25 || Banská Bystrica, Slovakia || Decision(Extra round) || 4 || 3:00
|-  style="background:#fbb;"
| 2015-04-11 || Loss ||align=left| Giorgio Petrosyan || Oktagon 2015: 20 years edition || Milan, Italy || Decision (majority) || 3 || 3:00
|-  style="background:#cfc;"
| 2015-02-28|| Win ||align=left| Erkan Varol || Akın Dövüş Arenası || Istanbul, Turkey || Decision || 3 || 3:00
|-  style="background:#cfc;"
| 2014-11-22|| Win ||align=left| Abdoul Touré || Mix Fight Gala XVII || Hanau, Germany || KO || 2 || 
|-
! style=background:white colspan=9 |
|-  style="background:#cfc;"
| 2014-10-12|| Win ||align=left| Buakaw Banchamek || K-1 World MAX 2014 World Championship Tournament Final || Pattaya, Thailand || Forfeit || 4 || 0:00
|-
! style=background:white colspan=9 |
|-  style="background:#cfc;"
| 2014-04-26 || Win ||align=left| Chad Sugden || Mix Fight Gala XV || Darmstadt, Germany || Decision || 3 || 3:00
|-  style="background:#cfc;"
| 2014-02-23 || Win ||align=left| Shane Campbell || K-1 World MAX 2013 World Championship Tournament Final 4 || Baku, Azerbaijan || Decision || 3 || 3:00
|-  style="background:#cfc;"
| 2014-01-11 || Win ||align=left| Maximo Suárez || K-1 World MAX 2013 World Championship Tournament Quarter Final in Gran Canaria || Gran Canaria, Spain || Decision || 3 || 3:00
|-  style="background:#fbb;"
| 2013-12-22 || Loss ||align=left| Dzhabar Askerov || NewFC: Battle of the Stars || Makhachkala, Russia || Decision || 4 || 3:00
|-
! style=background:white colspan=9 |
|-  style="background:#fbb;"
| 2013-12-10 || Loss ||align=left| Buakaw Banchamek || MAX Muay Thai 5: The Final Chapter || Khon Kaen, Thailand || Decision || 3 || 3:00
|-  style="background:#cfc;"
| 2013-10-20 || Win ||align=left| Magomed Magomedov || Tatneft Cup 2012 Final || Kazan, Russia || Decision || 4 || 3:00
|-  style="background:#cfc;"
| 2013-09-14 || Win ||align=left| Henri van Opstal || K-1 World MAX 2013 World Championship Tournament Final 16 || Mallorca, Spain || Unanimous decision || 3 || 3:00
|-  style="background:#cfc;"
| 2013-06-15 || Win  ||align=left| Erkan Varol || Mix Fight Gala XIV || Darmstadt, Germany || Decision (unanimous)|| 5  || 3:00
|-
! style=background:white colspan=9 |
|-  style="background:#cfc;"
| 2013-05-06 || win ||align=left| Berneung Topkingboxing || Thailand vs Europe 2013 || Ulm, Germany || KO (Spinning Elbow) || 4 || 
|-  style="background:#c5d2ea;"
| 2013-03-23 || Draw ||align=left| Aikpracha Meenayothin || MAX Muay Thai 1 || Surin, Thailand || Draw || 3 || 3:00 
|-  style="background:#cfc;"
| 2012-05-05 || Win ||align=left| Nonsai Sor.Sanyakorn || Thailand vs Germany 2012 || Heidenheim, Germany || KO (spinning back elbow) || 3 || 2:20
|-  style="background:#cfc;"
| 2012-09-01 || Win ||align=left| Mohammed Medhar || Mix Fight Gala XIII || Frankfurt, Germany || KO (knee injury) ||  2 || 0:54
|-  style="background:#fbb;"
| 2012-05-05 || Loss ||align=left| Alex Vogel || La Familia Fight Night III || Halle, Germany || DQ (Groin Kick) ||  e || 0:15
|-  style="background:#fbb;"
| 2011-11-06 || Loss ||align=left| Jaochalarm Chatkranok || Thailand vs Germany 2011 || Ulm, Germany || Split decision || 5 || 3:00
|-  style="background:#cfc;"
| 2011-12-04 || Win ||align=left|  || WMC King's Cup 2011 Quarterfinal || Bangkok, Thailand  || TKO || 2 || 0:35
|-  style="background:#fbb;"
| 2010-10-10 || Loss ||align=left| Murat Direkçi || Mix Fight Gala 10 || Darmstadt, Germany || TKO (left hook) || 1 || 2:37
|-  style="background:#fbb;"
| 2009-12-05 || Loss ||align=left| Fadi Merza || King's Cup, Quarter Final || Bangkok, Thailand || Decision || 3 || 3:00 
|-
| colspan=9 | Legend:

See also
 List of K-1 events
 List of male kickboxers

References

External links
 Official ONE Championship profile

German male kickboxers
Welterweight kickboxers
German Muay Thai practitioners
1992 births
Living people
Kunlun Fight kickboxers
ONE Championship kickboxers